The Hunter 216 is an American trailerable sailboat that was designed by Glenn Henderson as a daysailer and cruiser, and first built in 2003.

The Hunter 216 design, with its thermo plastic hull, was developed into the Hunter 22-2 in 2010. The 22-2 is a similar boat, but built in more conventional fiberglass.

Production
The design was built by Hunter Marine in the United States starting in 2003, but it is now out of production. A total of 250 were built.

Design
The Hunter 216 is an unsinkable recreational keelboat, built predominantly of thermo plastic. It has a fractional sloop rig, a plumb stem, an open reverse transom, a lifting internally-mounted VARA rudder controlled by a tiller and a hydraulically operated lifting fin keel. It displaces  and carries  of lead ballast.

Factory options included a  asymmetrical spinnaker, portable toilet, motor mount and a highway trailer.

The boat is normally fitted with a small outboard motor for docking and maneuvering.

See also
List of sailing boat types

Related development
Hunter 22-2

Similar sailboats
Hunter 212
Mistral T-21
San Juan 21

References

External links
Official brochure

Keelboats
2000s sailboat type designs
Sailing yachts
Trailer sailers
Sailboat type designs by Glenn Henderson
Sailboat types built by Hunter Marine